KMXD (100.5 FM) is a radio station licensed to Monroe, Utah, United States. The station is owned by Sanpete County Broadcasting Co.

References

External links

News and talk radio stations in the United States
MXD